Georges Baal (born György Balassa; 17 May 1938 – 6 December 2013) was a Hungarian writer, theatrologist, actor, director and psychologist.

Georges Baal died of a heart attack on 6 December 2013, aged 75, in Saint-Mandé, Paris, France, where he had lived since 1956.

References

1938 births
2013 deaths
Theatre people from Budapest
Hungarian expatriates in France
Journalists from Budapest
Theatrologists
Hungarian male actors
Hungarian male dramatists and playwrights
20th-century Hungarian male writers
21st-century Hungarian male writers
20th-century Hungarian dramatists and playwrights
21st-century Hungarian dramatists and playwrights